Noadya Lahat (born June 8, 1984), also known by the nickname Neo,  is an Israeli mixed martial artist who competes in the Featherweight division. A professional since 2008, he is the second Israeli to ever fight in the UFC and has competed for Bellator MMA.

Background
Lahat began training in judo at age of four, eventually training with the Israeli Olympic team in his adolescent years. After a three-year stint in the Israeli Defense Forces, Lahat came back for another year of judo before finding Brazilian jiu-jitsu.

Mixed martial arts career

Early career
Lahat began competing professionally in 2008, competing first as a lightweight, then as a featherweight for various regional promotions. He was able to compile an undefeated record along the way of 7–0 with six finishes before signing with the UFC in January 2014.

Ultimate Fighting Championship
Lahat made his promotional debut on March 23, 2014 against Godofredo Pepey at UFC Fight Night 38. He lost the fight via flying knee knockout in the first round.

Lahat faced Steven Siler on July 26, 2014 at UFC on Fox 12. Lahat won the fight via unanimous decision.

Lahat faced Niklas Bäckström on June 20, 2015 at UFC Fight Night 69 He won the back and forth fight by majority decision (28-28, 29-28, 29-28).

Following his military service, Lahat returned to the UFC to face Diego Rivas at UFC Fight Night: Hendricks vs. Thompson.  Lahat controlled the first round, almost getting several submissions on Rivas.  However, after 23 seconds in the second round he lost the fight via a flying knee knockout and was rendered unconscious for several minutes and was subsequently released from the promotion.

Bellator MMA
On June 9, 2016, it was reported that Lahat has signed a deal with Bellator MMA.

Lahat made his promotional debut against Scott Cleve at Bellator 164 on November 10, 2016. He won the fight via submission in the first round.

Lahat faced Lloyd Carter at Bellator 175 on March 31, 2017. He won the fight via submission in the second round.

Lahat faced Henry Corrales at Bellator 182 on August 25, 2017. He lost the fight by unanimous decision.

Lahat faced Jeremiah Labiano at Bellator 188 on November 16, 2017. He won via unanimous decision.

Lahat faced Bellator Bantamweight World Champion Darrion Caldwell in a non-title fight at Bellator 204 on August 17, 2018 in Sioux Falls, South Dakota. He lost the fight by knockout in the second round.

Despite defeating Brian Moore via unanimous decision at Bellator 210 on November 30, 2018, Lahat was released from the promotion.

Post-Bellator career
After parting ways with Bellator, Lahat faced Sean Soriano at UAE Warriors 18 on March 20, 2021. He lost the fight via first-round knockout.

Mixed martial arts record

|-
| Loss
|align=center|13–5
|Sean Soriano
|TKO (punches)
|UAE Warriors 18
|
|align=center|1
|align=center|2:01
|Abu Dhabi, United Arab Emirates
|
|-
|Win
|align=center|13–4
|Brian Moore
|Decision (unanimous)
|Bellator 210
|
|align=center|3
|align=center|5:00
|Thackerville, Oklahoma, United States
|
|-
|Loss
|align=center|12–4
|Darrion Caldwell
|KO (punches)
|Bellator 204
|
|align=center|2
|align=center|2:46
|Sioux Falls, South Dakota, United States
|
|-
| Win
| align=center| 12–3
| Jeremiah Labiano
| Decision (unanimous)
| Bellator 188
| 
| align=center| 3
| align=center| 5:00
| Tel Aviv, Israel
| 
|-
|Loss
|align=center|11–3
|Henry Corrales
|Decision (unanimous)
|Bellator 182
|
|align=center|3
|align=center|5:00
|Verona, New York, United States
|
|-
|Win
|align=center|11–2
|Lloyd Carter
|Submission (rear-naked choke)
|Bellator 175
|
|align=center|2
|align=center|3:50
|Rosemont, Illinois, United States
|
|-
|Win
|align=center|10–2
|Scott Cleve
|Submission (rear-naked choke)
|Bellator 164
|
|align=center|1
|align=center|2:26
|Tel Aviv, Israel
|
|-
|Loss
|align=center|9–2
|Diego Rivas
|KO (flying knee)
|UFC Fight Night: Hendricks vs. Thompson
|
|align=center|2
|align=center|0:23
|Las Vegas, Nevada, United States
|
|-
|Win
|align=center|9–1
|Niklas Bäckström
|Decision (majority)
|UFC Fight Night: Jędrzejczyk vs. Penne
|
|align=center|3
|align=center|5:00
|Berlin, Germany
|
|-
|Win
|align=center|8–1
|Steven Siler
|Decision (unanimous)
|UFC on Fox: Lawler vs. Brown
|
|align=center|3
|align=center|5:00
|San Jose, California, United States
|
|-
|Loss
|align=center|7–1
|Godofredo Pepey
|KO (flying knee)
|UFC Fight Night: Shogun vs. Henderson 2
|
|align=center|1
|align=center|2:39
|Natal, Brazil
| 
|-
|Win
|align=center|7–0
|Shad Smith
|Decision (unanimous)
|BAMMA USA - Badbeat 10
|
|align=center|3
|align=center|5:00
|Commerce, California, United States
| 
|-
|Win
|align=center|6–0
|Rodney Rhoden
|TKO (knees)
|Impact MMA - Recognition
|
|align=center|2
|align=center|2:31
|Pleasanton, California, United States
| 
|-
|Win
|align=center|5–0
|Richard Schiller 
|Submission (rear-naked choke)
|King of the West - Rage Against the Ropes
|
|align=center|1
|align=center|2:15
|Hollywood, California, United States
|
|-
|Win
|align=center|4–0
|Pete Sabala
|Submission (triangle choke)
|Champion Promotions - Clash of the Gladiators 1
|
|align=center|2
|align=center|2:37
|Coachella, California, United States
|
|-
|Win
|align=center|3–0
|Slava Antipenko
|Submission (triangle choke)
|Dog Fight 4
|
|align=center|1
|align=center|2:54
|Tel Aviv, Israel
|
|-
|Win
|align=center|2–0
|Anthony Rodriguez
|Submission (rear-naked choke)
|All-Star Boxing - Caged in the Cannon
|
|align=center|1
|align=center|1:51
|Montebello, California, United States
|
|-
|Win
|align=center|1-0
|Nikita Ivanciov
|TKO (punches)
|Desert Combat Challenge 7
|
|align=center|2
|align=center|1:27
|Tel Aviv, Israel
|

See also
List of select Jewish mixed martial artists

References

External links

 
 

1984 births
Living people
Sportspeople from Petah Tikva
Israeli male mixed martial artists
Israeli expatriate sportspeople in the United States
Featherweight mixed martial artists
Mixed martial artists utilizing judo
Mixed martial artists utilizing Brazilian jiu-jitsu
Ultimate Fighting Championship male fighters
Israeli practitioners of Brazilian jiu-jitsu
People awarded a black belt in Brazilian jiu-jitsu
Israeli male judoka
Israeli soldiers
Jewish male martial artists